IQ Analytics is a member company of AIM listed recruitment organisation the InterQuest Group.

Formerly known as Intelect, IQ Analytics joined the InterQuest Group in 2007. IQ Analytics are a specialist analytics focused recruitment organisation with offices in London and Manchester. Though the majority of their business is based in the UK, they also place a significant amount of their focus on clients within the US market.

References

External links
Official website

Companies based in the City of London
Employment agencies of the United Kingdom